The Solway Sharks are the only senior ice hockey club in South West Scotland or Cumbria and play out of Dumfries Ice Bowl, King Street, Dumfries, Scotland.
 
In the 2015–16 season the Sharks are playing in the English National Ice Hockey League North's Moralee Conference (Division One) and in the Challenge Cup. Home games are played at Dumfries Ice Bowl on Saturday evenings with a 7pm face-off.
 
The Sharks were formed in 1998 and in their lifetime have won a host of trophies including two Northern League championships, one Northern League Play-Off title, six St. Andrew's Cups and two Scottish Cups to name but a few. In 2021, the Sharks won the NIHL Division 1 National Championship after defeating Streatham IHC in the final at the Coventry Skydome.

Honours

 National Ice Hockey League (North) Division One Champions: 2012–13, 2013–14
 National Ice Hockey League (North) Division One Play Off Champions 2013–14
 English National League (North) Division Two Champions: 2011–12
 Northern Cup Winners: 2011–12, 2012–13, 2013–14
 Northern League Champions: 2008–09, 2009–10
 Northern League Play-off Champions: 2009–10
 Scottish First Division champions: 1998–99, 1999–00
 Scottish Cup winners: 1998–99, 1999–00, 2003–04
 Spring Cup winners: 2003–04, 2005–06
 Autumn Cup winners: 2004–05
 St Andrews Cup winners: 2001–02, 2002–03, 2005–06, 2007–08, 2008–09, 2009–10, 2010–11
 Dumfries Tournament Winners: 2005–06, 2009–10
 Dumfries and Galloway Sports Personalities of the Year: 1998–99

Club roster 2022-23
(*''') Denotes a Non-British Trained player (Import)

2021/22 Outgoing

References
Solway Sharks Website - https://www.solwaysharksdumfries.co.uk/

Ice hockey teams in Scotland
Sport in Dumfries
Ice hockey clubs established in 1998
1998 establishments in Scotland